The Pakistan Champions Cricket League (PCCL) is a Twenty20 Club cricket league in Pakistan which was organised by Pakistan former captain Rashid Latif at Rashid Latif Cricket Academy (RLCA) in co-operation with Karachi City Cricket Organisation (KCCA). The event was previously known as Karachi Champions League which hosted only 16 cricket clubs from the city in 2010.

In 2012, the League was able to expand and host 40 cricket clubs which included 7 international clubs, 16 clubs from Karachi and 17 other cricket clubs from all over Pakistan. The teams were divided into 8 groups. The tournament was hosted by five different venues of the city. This was the second edition started by the Pakistan Cricket Champions League. Some of the matches were telecast by a Pakistan sports channel, Geo Super.

The prize money of Champion Club was $20,000 for the winner, whereas $10,000 for the runners up clubs and $2,000 each for semi finalist clubs.

The first event was won by Airport Gymkhana.

Number of teams 

There were 40 teams participating in the event.

The Karachi teams are the ones without a city shown after their name.

 Nazimabad Gymkhana
 Malir Gymkhana
 Diamond CC (Islamabad)
 P&T Gymkhana (Lahore)
 Khyber Green CC (FATA)
 Khan sports (Hyderabad, Sindh)
 Airport Gymkhana
 AO Sports
 Peshawar CC (Peshawar)
 Hong Kong national cricket team
 Phoenix Medicine (United Arab Emirates national cricket team)
 Dammam CC (Saudi Arabia)
 Riyadh City Cricket Association (Saudi Arabia)
 Qatar Cricket Association
 Afghanistan Youth Club Best Team (Afghanistan Cricket Board)
 Al-Abbas Cricket Club (Burewala)
 CA Sports (Sialkot)
 Rawalpindi Kings (Rawalpindi)
 SG Jadoon CC (Abbottabad)
 Combined Cricket Club of (Faisalabad)
 Aga Khan Gymkhana
 Al-Noor Gymkhana
 Tando Adam
 Ghouri C.C. (Hyderabad, Sindh)
 Vital Five CC
 Crescent C.C. (Multan)
 Quaid-e-Azam (Rahimyarkhan)
 Asifabad Sports
 Dawood Sport
 Gul C.C. (Rawalpindi)
 Marker C.C. (Quetta)
 Muhammad Hussain CC
 Faisalabad CC
 Landhi Friend Landhi Gymkhana
 Muslim CC (Lahore)
 United Sports
 Pak Korangi
 Korangi Al-Fatha
 National Cricket Club (Riyadh)

Visa denied

The visas of Indian origin players from Berry Cricket Club of Canada was denied after which the club refused to come and take part in the tournament

Points table

 Group A 

 Group B 

 Group C 

 Group D 

 Group E 

 Group F 

 Group G 

 Group H 

 Knockouts 

Notable players

Fawad Alam (Al-Noor Gymkhana), Wahab Riaz (Al-Noor Gymkhana), Zulqarnain Haider (P&T Gymkhana), Yasir Hameed (Peshawar C.C.), Anwar Ali (Pakistan C.C.), Awais Zia (Pak Korangi) Abdul Razzaq, (Muslim C.C) etc.

Notable performancesHattrick Adnan Ghani (Rawalpindi Kings 3–18 vs Phoenix Medicine UAE), Sheraz Bhatti (Rawalpindi Kings 5–16 vs Asifabad Sports),Best bowling figures: Shahzaib Khan (malir Gymkhana 5–9 vs Asifabad Sports), Ramiz Aziz (vital five 5–12 vs Faisalabad CC ), Junaid Nadir (SG Jadoon Abbottabad, 5–22 vs Airport Gymkhana), Junaid Jan (Muslim gymkhana lahore, 5–16 vs SST Club Dammam)Best Batting Figures: Saeed Khan (Khyber green C.C, 107 vs Rawalpindi Kings), Shahid Yousuf (CA Sports Sialkot, 129 vs P&T Gymkhana Lahore) Ejaz ali shah (Al-Noor Gymkhana) 81 (53 balls)Highest Team totals''

Nazimabad Gymkhana 197–2 vs Mohammad Hussain C.C

Khyber green C.C 170–9 vs Malir Gymkhana

Venues

Group matches 

 RLCA ground Korangi(live telecast)
 RLCA ground Gulberg
 RLCA (New Karachi)
 Asghar Ali Shah Cricket Stadium
 Landhi Gymkhana

Live telecast 

Geo Super

See also

 Pakistan Premier League (Twenty20)
 Super-8 T20 Cup
 Twenty-20 Cup
2012–13 Faysal Bank T20 Cup

References

Cricket leagues in Pakistan
Twenty20 cricket leagues
Club cricket